The 1958 United States Senate election in Rhode Island took place on November 4, 1958. Incumbent Democratic U.S. Senator John Pastore successfully sought re-election, defeating Republican Bayard Ewing in a repeat of their 1952 race.

Primary elections 
The Democratic primary was held on September 17, 1958, and the Republican primary was held on September 25, 1958.

Democratic primary

Candidates 
John Pastore, incumbent U.S. Senator

Results

Republican primary

Candidates 
Bayard Ewing, attorney, Republican national committeeman, Republican nominee for Senate in 1952

Results

General election

Results

References

Bibliography

External links

Rhode Island
1958
1958 Rhode Island elections